The Rural Municipality of Franklin is a former rural municipality (RM) in the Canadian province of Manitoba. It was incorporated on December 22, 1883. It ceased on January 1, 2015 as a result of a provincially mandated amalgamation with the Town of Emerson to form the Municipality of Emerson – Franklin.

Geography 
The RM was located in the southeastern part of Manitoba, along the border between the province and the U.S. state of Minnesota.  According to Statistics Canada, the former RM had an area of 953.34 km2 (368.09 sq mi).

Population 
The 2006 Census reported a population of 1,768 persons.  Communities within the former RM include:

 Arnaud
 Carlowrie
 Dominion City
 Fredensthal
 Green Ridge
 Ridgeville
 Rosa
 Roseau River
 Senkiw
 Tolstoi
 Woodmore

Adjacent municipalities 
Rural Municipality of Montcalm - (west, northwest)
Rural Municipality of De Salaberry - (north)
Rural Municipality of Stuartburn - (east)
Kittson County, Minnesota - (south)
Emerson (town) - (southwest)*

See also
Manitoba municipal amalgamations, 2015

References

External links
 Map of Franklin R.M. at Statcan

Franklin
Populated places disestablished in 2015
2015 disestablishments in Manitoba